Kaset Sombun is a district (amphoe) in the northern part of Chaiyaphum province, northeastern Thailand.

History
Originally, Kaset Sombun was a minor district under Phu Khio District. In 1917 the minor district's name was changed from Kaset Sombun to Ban Yang, the name of the central tambon. On 1 March 1939 the minor district was upgraded to a full district and given back its historical name, Kaset Sombun.

Geography
Neighbouring districts are (from the north clockwise) Khon San, Phu Khiao, Kaeng Khro, Mueang Chaiyaphum and Nong Bua Daeng.

To the north of the district is the Phu Khiao Wildlife Reserve. Phu Laen Kha National Park is in the three southeastern tambons of the district, and continues to the southwest to Mueang and Nong Bua Daeng Districts.

Administration
The district is divided into 11 subdistricts (tambons), which are further subdivided into 144 villages (mubans). There are two subdistrict municipalities (thesaban tambons): Kaset Sombun covers parts of tambon Ban Yang and Ban Pao parts of the same-named tambon. There are a further 11 tambon administrative organizations (TAO).

Geocode 11 belongs to Sap Si Thong, which was reassigned to Mueang Chaiyaphum District in 2003.

References

External links
amphoe.com (Thai)

Kaset Sombun